Bhrigu Parbat is a mountain of the Garhwal Himalaya in Uttarakhand India. It is situated in the Gangotri National Park. It is joint 167th highest located entirely within the Uttrakhand. Nanda Devi, is the highest mountain in this category. It lies NNW to Manda I  its nearest higher neighbor.

Climbing history
A nine-member Indian expedition team from west Bengal led by Dr Anjan Chaudhary climbed Bhrigu Parvat (6041m), on September 2, 2001. They approached the peak from north of Manda via the Kedar Kharak. The summit was reached on September 2 by Tanmoy Chakraborty and Arun Danti Das.

Neighboring and subsidiary peaks
Neighboring or subsidiary peaks of Bhrigu Parbat:
 Manda III: 
 Shivling: 
 Gangotri I: 
 Jogin II: 
 Thalay Sagar: 
 Meru Peak:

Glaciers and rivers
On the western side lies Kedar Bamak and on the eastern side lies Bhrigupanth Bamak and Manda Bamak. Kedar Ganga emerges from Kedar bamak and joins Bhagirathi River near Gangotri. Bhrigupanth Bamak and Manda Bamak drain down to Bhagirathi River near Bhojwas. Bhagirathi joins the Alaknanda River the other main tributaries of river Ganga at Dev Prayag and called Ganga there after.

See also

 List of Himalayan peaks of Uttarakhand

References

Mountains of Uttarakhand
Six-thousanders of the Himalayas
Geography of Chamoli district